Facundo José Arregui (born 15 September 1997) is an Argentine Paralympic swimmer who competes at international swimming competitions. He specialises in freestyle swimming and open water swimming. He is a Parapan American Games champion and a World silver medalist in freestyle swimming. He also competed at the Argentina at the 2016 Summer Paralympics where he finished fifth place in the 400 m freestyle S7 event.

Family
Arregui's father is Fernando Arregui is a water polo player, he competed in the water polo at the 2011 Pan American Games and is also Facundo's swimming coach. Facundo's sister Camilla Arregui is a synchronized swimmer who has competed at the 2017 and 2019 World Aquatics Championships.

References

1997 births
Living people
Sportspeople from Rosario, Santa Fe
Paralympic swimmers of Argentina
Argentine male freestyle swimmers
Swimmers at the 2016 Summer Paralympics
Medalists at the 2015 Parapan American Games
Medalists at the 2019 Parapan American Games
Medalists at the World Para Swimming Championships
S7-classified Paralympic swimmers